Suicidal ambivalence – coexistence of the will to live and the desire to die in people with suicidal tendencies.

Craig Bryan et al. define the suicidal ambivalence as a relative balance between a will of live and wanting to die. As they point out, one could suppose that people at high suicide risk would generally want to die. However, apart of desire of death they actually present desire to continue life what means they are ambivalent to the matter of live and death, what was observed in 1960s. Kovacs & Beck in 1977 described this idea as the internal struggle hypothesis. They corroborated it by research in which a half of inpatient hospitalized after suicide attempt admitted an internal struggle between life and death, 40% of them inclined to death and 9% expressed a will of live. Moreover, consecutive research showed that the ambivalence does not disappear even in the moment of suicide attempt.

A suicidal ambivalence is predictor of suicidal behaviors. A suicidal risk depends on relative balance of will of live and wanting to finish to. Persons inclined rather towards death died in one of research 6.5 time more frequently than ambivalent ones inclined rather to live. O'Connor et al. even tried to categorize person at risk due to suicidal ambivalence. In the group of prevailing desire to die patients significantly more often revealed attempting suicide than ambivalent persons or ones with prevailing will of live. The group differed also in the level of helplessness and subjectively perceived suicide risk.

In the case of person in the suicide crisis a full psychiatric examination is recommended with possible psychiatric hospitalization depending on suicide risk evaluation.

References 

Suicide